Aloo tama or aloo bodi tama is a Nepali soup dish made of fermented bamboo shoots, potatoes and black-eyed peas.

Etymology 
Aloo tama can literally be translated as potato and tama soup. Tama is fermented bamboo shoots that has a strong sour taste.

Preparation 
A simple potato curry is cooked and at the final stages the bamboo is fried (some may not choose to do it) and added to the soup. Another ingredient in this soup very commonly used would be bodi or tane bodi which is the black eyed peas making it aloo tama bodi. Garlic, tomatoes and lemon are also used by some people.

See also
 List of soups
 Kwati
 Gundruk

References

 
Vegetable soups